Marion Annie Palmer (born 11 January 1953 in Hammerfest) is a Norwegian author, based in Kvalsund, Finnmark.

In the 1970s, Palmer was involved in the ml movement and AKP. She worked for 14 years as a factory worker at Friogrill in Trondheim, where she became active in industrial relations, and for a time was site foreman. 

She made her debut with the poetry collection Alle pikene løper til vinduet about life as she saw it from the window of the fish-processing factory.

Bibliography 
 Alle pikene løper til vinduet, poetry, prose (1995)
 Utsatte strøk, poetry and prose (1999)
 Guttaperka, novel (2002)
 Bare kirka sto igjen, stories from the war in Finnmark (2010)

References

External links 

Marion Annie Palmer at the Author catalogue on Forfattersentrum's website
 Marion Palmer at the Sundet's truckstop website
 Marion Palmer at the Litteraturnett Nord-Norges website

Norwegian trade unionists
Norwegian writers
People from Hammerfest
1953 births
Living people